Lybia australiensis is a species of small crab in the family Xanthidae. It is known only from the type specimen, collected in 1928 among bryozoans at Port Jackson, New South Wales.

References

Xanthoidea
Crustaceans of Australia
Crustaceans described in 1933